Center for Transportation and Logistics Neuer Adler or CNA is a German association for industries active in the transport and logistics sectors. The name "Neuer Adler" alludes to Adler, the first railway locomotive in Germany.

References

External links

Logistics in Germany
Professional associations based in Germany
Transport associations in Germany
Organisations based in Bavaria